HMS Cygnet was a two funnel, 30 knot destroyer ordered by the Royal Navy under the 1896–1897 Naval Estimates. She was the thirteenth ship to carry this name. She was launched in 1898, served in the Chatham division before World War I and was tendered to the gunnery school at Sheerness during the war. She was sold for breaking in 1920.

Construction
She was laid down as yard number 320 on 25 September 1896, at the John I Thornycroft and Company shipyard at Chiswick on the River Thames.  She was launched on 3 September 1898.  During her builder's trials her maximum average speed was 30.3 knots. She proceeded to Portsmouth to have her armament fitted and was completed and accepted by the Royal Navy in late February 1900. During her acceptance trials and work ups her average sea speed was 25 knots.

Pre-War
Cygnet commissioned at Chatham in March 1900 and was assigned to the Harwich Flotilla, Commander Cecil Hickley in command. In 1899–1900, she was part of the Medway instructional Flotilla.

Lieutenant Robert G. D. Dewar was appointed in command in early 1902, but was replaced by Lieutenant George J. Todd later that year.

On 30 August 1912, the Admiralty directed all destroyer classes were to be designated by alpha characters starting with the letter 'A'. Since her design speed was 30-knots and she had two funnels she was assigned to the D class. After 30 September 1913, she was known as a D-class destroyer and had the letter ‘D’ painted on the hull below the bridge area and on either the fore or aft funnel.

World War I
In August 1914, found her in active commission at The Nore Local Flotilla based at Sheerness tendered to HMS Actaeon, the gunnery school. She remained in this assignment for the duration of the First World War.

Decommissioning and disposal
In 1919, she was paid off and laid-up in reserve awaiting disposal. Cygnet was sold on 29 April 1920 to Thos. W. Ward of Sheffield for breaking at Rainham, Kent, on the Thames Estuary.

Pennant numbers

References

Publications
 
 
 
 
 
 
 
 
 
 

 

Ships built in Chiswick
1898 ships
D-class destroyers (1913)
Ships built by John I. Thornycroft & Company